The Limbu nation is made up of hundreds of clans. Each Limbu clans are classified under their Tribe or subnational entity or according to their place of origin. Almost all the Limbu clan names are unique, therefore it is not necessary to specify the Tribe or the place of origin every time the clan name is said.

The most Limbu (Yakthung) tribes are the original inhabitants and descended from the ancient Kirata mentioned in such Hindu epics as the Mahabharata.

Although, some of the clan names may not be unique for example: Chongbang or Maden. They are divided by listing their tribe name before or after their clan. Chongbang can be Sireng-Chongbang or Hukppa-Chongbang or Chongbang Kyak, similarly Maden clan can be specifically Tilling-Maden or Thokleng-Maden or Tunglung-Maden or Phendua-Maden. Listed Chaobisia, Mawakhola, Tambarkhola, Charkhola, Maiwakhola, Panthar, Tinkhola, Phedap and Yangrok are the names of the places where the respective clans belong to. Chaobisia refers to present day Dhankuta and Morang districts, Tambarkhola area is in present-day Taplejung district, Mewakhola area refers to present day Taplejung and Sankhuwasabha districts, Charkhola is a present-day Ilam and Jhapa districts, Maiwakhola area is in present-day Taplejung district, Tinkhola is in Panchthar district, Panthar is Panchthar district, Phedap is the north-central area of Terhathum district, Athraya is in northeastern Terhathum district, Chethar is in southern Terhathum, Sankhuwasabha and eastern Dhankuta district. Yangrok area is in present-day Southeast Taplejung, Northeast Panchthar districts and west Sikkim. All of these areas make up Limbuwan.

Nationality
The unification of Limbuwan kingdoms and Nepal has brought changed on Yakthung (Limbu) as live in Limbuwan as Limbu, Subba and ranked them as one of the unenslavable alcohol consuming groups.The Limbus have divided into three nationality Nepalese Limbu, bhutanese limbu and Indian Limbu. As the parts of Nepal they are so called Braves in the living World.

Clans and marriages
To Limbus, genealogy is very important before conducting marriages. Limbus do not marry within their own clan known as incest and not into their mother's clan or their grandmothers' clan. Some Traditional and cultural Limbus with strong background, avoid marriages into clans from which they derive their blood, up to seven generations in their father's line and up to five generations in their mother's line. That means Marriages into great-great-great-grandmothers' clans are also avoided.

The clan names have terms attached to it as well, Libang means the Archer, Tilling means the Police, Menyangbo means the successful one, Samba means the priest, etc. However, clans also have meanings which evolved from sentences e.g. Hembya was according to legend, evolved from "Hey' nangh wa" which translates to "Over there also". However, on original verbal dialect, 'Hembya' would be pronounced as "Hem-phe". This name was previously used to identify Thebe's next clan who settled in a different territory.

The following are the list of Limbu clans.

List of Limbu clans 

{|
|valign="top"|

P 
Pabemba
Padupling
Pahim
Pahtangna
Painger
Pak - Sangwa
Pak - Serma
Pak - Pheyak
Pakpasomba
Paksangwa
Pakseng
Pakserma
Palahajum
Palange
Palghe
Palungwa
Pambokpa
Pangyanggu
Pangba Phago
Pangboma
Pangenhang
Pangma(Pangmali)
Pankemyang
Panphoma
pangdhak (spread out from labri, khesera, bokhim,tamrang and saplakhu villages)
Papalang
Papo 
Papsong
Parghari
Parangden
Parangen
Pahango
Pataha
Patare
Pegwa
Pekim
Pemba
Pembasong
Penchangwa
Penjelam
Penjetamlingba
Pettehba
Phaklecha
Phakole
Phalechuwa
Phalechuwa
Phamphe
phatra
Phedap
Pheguba
Phegwaden
Phejonba
Phejong
Phembu
Phemsong
Phewaden
Phiyak
Phombo
Phonjela
Phonpho
Phonthak
Phonyang
Phopra
Photre
Patangwa
Phudunghang
Phuglala
Phungenahang
Pichchowa
Pobemba
Podalung - Tilling
Podalung - Tinkhole
Poinyanggu
Pomu
Pongjange
Pehim
Potangna - Tumbangphe
Potangwa - Sambahang
Pothangehere
Potro
Punglai-ing
Punjemba
Puradin
Purumbo
Purungbo
|width="50"| 
|valign="top"|

S 
Sabenhimba
Sademba
Sakwademba
Sakwaden - Ponglai
Sakwaden - Tegim
Sakwaden - Tumbangphe
Sambahangphe
Selling
sambiu (Sembo or Simbu)
Samdangwa
Sameakamba
samra
Samsomba
Samsong
Samsohang
Sangba
Sangi
Sangpanggye
Sangsangbo
Sangsangu
Sangwa
Sanjung
Sansoyang

T 
Tababung-(Tabebung-sangamba Tabebung-khechhingse)
Tabelung
Takmademba
Takwaden
Tamba
Tambe
Tambedem
Tamdem
Tamling
Tamorangba
Tangba
Tangbhopa
Tangdewa
Tanjamba
Tegela
Tegim
Tegoba
Tegothopra
Tengbung
Teyung
Tellok
Tembeh
Tengubumthupia
Tentak
Terathar
Thaksu
Thaklang
Thaklung
Thalang(chongbang & maden)
Thalung
Thamsuhang
Thangden
Thangamba
Theguba
Thebe-Sing
Thebe-thuppoko
Thoglema
Thoklen
Thokpeba
Thoksuba - Khewa
Thoksuba - Songyokpa
Thopra 
Thumba
Thumsa
Thumyangba
Thupukum
Tigalla
Tikapatti
Tinglabe
Tinkote
Todopa
Togleng
Toklehang
Toklengkya
Tokphela
Tokponden
Tole
Topetlagu
Tubuk
Tukimo
Tukohang
Tum - Papo
Tum - Pheyak
Tum - Sangwa
Tum - Serma
Tum - Kurumbang
Tumbah - Khewa
Tumbahang
Tumbang
Tumbahangphe - Phedapea
Tumbahangphe - Tokleng
Tumbahangphe - Phendua
Tumbapo - papo
Tumbrok - Papo
Tumbrok - Phago
Tumrok - Tokleng
Tumruk - Panthare
Tumsa
Tumsangwa
Tumsengwate
Tumsong
Tumyang
Tunesang
Tungbamphe - Chethare
Tungbamphe - Mewakhole
Tungbamphe - Nembang
Tungbanphe
Tungbaphu - Nalbo
Tungkamphs
Tungkong - Chaobisia
Tungkong - CHethare
Tunglung
Tunghang
Tupunge
 
|width="50"| 
|valign="top"|

Sanyak
Sapla
Sapta
Sardaphe
Saring
Sawaden
Sayorana
Sendang
Sedemba - Mabho
Sedemba - Sambahang
Selling
Semhang
Sene
Senehang
Sengsaugbo
Sengwangyang
Sere
Serma
Serangchongbang
Settling
Sewa
Sialungma
Siba
Silingbo
Sinehang
Sing - Thebe
Sing Maden - Khewa
Sing Maden - Tilling
Singak
Singdaba
Singgokhang
Singh - Kurungbhong
Singjango
Singokua
Singthape
Singyemba
Sigu
Skuwaba
Sobegu
Sodemba
Sodung
Sokiklumba
Song
Songbamphe
Sambahangphe
Songbo
Songmi
Songrungbang
Songyokpa - Chaubisia
Songyokpa - Phago
Songyokpa - Kurumbang
Subasang - Lingden
Subasong - Lingkhim
Subasong - Tambarkhole
Suguwa
Suhang
Sukarengba
Suknawab
Sungwapak
Sanyokpa(Tumba)
|width="50"| 
|valign="top"|

U 
Umdeme
Unglingba
Unjumba
Ussuk
|width="50"| 
|valign="top"|

W 
Wabungia
Wade
Wahek
Waji - Chaobisia
Waji - Phedapea
Waji - Athraya
Wanem - Phago
Warakpa
Warupa
Wayahnag-Kajum
Wayam Kajum
Wegu
Werniba
Wetupma
Wobungia
Wodokba
Woyang
Worumhang

Y 
Yakso
Yakpaden
Yambhota
Yangboku
Yangboten
Yangdem
Yangdemba
Yanghimba
Yangnam
Yangrokia
Yangsata
Yangseba
Yangsoba
Ya ngwago
Yangya
Yanroke
Yanwabhu
Yawa
Yekten
Yengdem
Yengden
Yengdemba
Yohimbang
Yokippa
Yokpangden
Yoksoba
Yoksuba
Yoksuma
Yongatemba
Yongden - thopra
Yongeywa
Yonghang
Yongya*Yongya
yungsahang
Yakyuk

See also

Limbu nugo hang
Limbu language
Limbu script
Limbuwan Gorkha War history
Rambahadur Limbu
Limbuwan
Sikkim
Limbuwan-Gorkha Treaty of 1774
Limbuwan Autonomy
Limbu Festivals 
Chasok Tangnam

References

Surnames
Ethnic groups in Nepal
Himalayan peoples